Galaxy 17 is a communications satellite owned by Intelsat to be located at 91° West longitude, serving the North American market. Galaxy 17 was intended to replace SBS 6.  It was built by Alcatel Alenia Space (which is now Thales Alenia Space), in its Cannes Mandelieu Space Center, France.

Galaxy 17 was launched by Arianespace from Kourou, French Guiana on an Ariane 5 rocket along with Astra 1L. It became operational at 74° West longitude in the geostationary orbit and replaced SBS-6 which was moved out of the geostationary orbit to a parking orbit in the Graveyard orbit. This took place on July 7, 2007.  Galaxy 17 began its move to 91° West longitude when Horizons-2 was launched and placed in the 74° West longitude slot.  Horizons-2 was originally slated to replace SBS-6 but the launch was delayed, possibly due to the delayed repairs of the Sea Launch vessel.

Galaxy 17 is the first primarily European satellite to cover the U.S. Built by a French/Italian manufacturer, it was launched on a French rocket from a French spaceport. Galaxy 17 became operational again in mid July, 2008, when it took over traffic of Galaxy 11. As Galaxy 11 has effectively been replaced, any references to Galaxy 11 can now be considered references to Galaxy 17.

See also
 Classic Arts Showcase – a non-profit fine arts channel broadcast from Galaxy 17

References

External links 

 

Communications satellites in geostationary orbit
Satellite television
Spacecraft launched in 2007
Satellites using the Spacebus bus